Adjutant Edmond Jacques Marcel Pillon (b.1891 - d.1921) was a French World War I flying ace credited with eight aerial victories.

Biography
See also Aerial victory standards of World War I

Edmond Jacques Marcel Pillon was born in Chaville, France on 9 June 1891.

Pillon was called for his required military service in October 1913. On 2 August 1914, he was called to infantry duty. On 19 December 1914, he was forwarded to pilot training.

For unknown reasons, he was unusually long in qualifying as a pilot, not receiving his Military Pilot's Brevet until 8 June 1916.
He became a non-commissioned Nieuport pilot in 1916, and served in Escadrilles 102 and 82. He scored a single victory for Escadrille 102, on 2 August 1916. From 6 March to 3 September 1917, Pillon scored four more confirmed wins for Escadrille 82, along with a couple of unverified claims. His record then lapsed until he began scoring again in his new assignment to fly a Spad with Escadrille 67. He scattered three victories through 1918, on 20 April, 19 May, and 2 September.

Pillon died in a postwar flying accident at Toussus-le-Noble, on 8 June 1921.

Honors and awards

Médaille militaire

"Pilot of Escadrille N82, skillful and courageous, who always volunteers to take on the most perilous missions, and has already downed three German planes and engaged in more than fifty combats, during which his plane was often hit; on 21 April 1917, he attacked a balloon which he forced to descend; on 23 April he forced an enemy plane to land behind enemy lines; already cited in orders."

Sources of information

References

Franks, Norman (2000). Nieuport Aces of World War 1. Oxford UK: Osprey Publishing.  .

 Franks, Norman; Bailey, Frank (1993). Over the Front: The Complete Record of the Fighter Aces and Units of the United States and French Air Services, 1914–1918. London, UK: Grub Street Publishing. .

1891 births
1921 deaths
People from Chaville
French World War I flying aces
Recipients of the Croix de Guerre 1914–1918 (France)